Venance Zézé, nicknamed Zézéto, (born 17 June 1981 in Abidjan), is an Ivorian footballer who currently plays for Séwé Sport.

International
He has been capped by the Ivorian national side.

Career
Like many successful Ivorian footballers, he is a product of the famed youth academy at ASEC Abidjan, where he began his career. As a 17-year-old, Zézé scored twice for ASEC Abidjan in the 1999 CAF Super Cup final against Espérance de Tunis. Following this, he moved to Belgian side K.S.K. Beveren in 2001, where he starred with other Ivorians such as Yaya Touré and Gilles Yapi Yapo. He left Beveren in 2003 to join AA Gent, where he spent a season before moving to Brussels. In 2005, he returned to his former club Beveren for another season, before moving to Ukrainian side FC Metalurh Donetsk in 2006. After a successful loan to Metalurh's Vyscha Liga rivals FC Metalist Kharkiv in the first half of the 2007/08 season, a permanent transfer was agreed between the clubs on December 14, 2007. His contract with FF Jaro was revoked on 22 September 2011.

Clubs
 – 2001 ASEC Abidjan
2001–2003 K.S.K. Beveren
2003–2004 AA Gent
2004–2005 Brussels
2005–2006 K.S.K. Beveren
2006–2007 FC Metalurh Donetsk
2007–2011 FC Metalist Kharkiv
2010–2011 FF Jaro
2012 AC Oulu
2013 FC Haka
2014 FC Haka
2014– Séwé Sport

References

External links
Interview with Zezeto (French)

1981 births
Living people
Ivorian footballers
Ivorian expatriate footballers
Ivory Coast international footballers
Association football forwards
FF Jaro players
FC Metalist Kharkiv players
FC Metalurh Donetsk players
R.W.D.M. Brussels F.C. players
K.A.A. Gent players
K.S.K. Beveren players
FC Haka players
AC Oulu players
Belgian Pro League players
Ukrainian Premier League players
Veikkausliiga players
Ivorian expatriate sportspeople in Belgium
Expatriate footballers in Belgium
Expatriate footballers in Ukraine
Ivorian expatriate sportspeople in Ukraine
Expatriate footballers in Finland
Footballers from Abidjan